The Badimaya people (also written Badimia) are an Aboriginal Australian people from the Mid West region of Western Australia.

Country

This country covers Cue, Nannine and Mount Magnet to the north, Paynes Find to the south, Yalgoo to the southwest, and the northwest lay along the Sandford River.

Language

Badimaya belongs to the Kartu branch of the Pama–Nyungan family. It is a critically endangered language, however there is a strong language revival movement underway in the Badimaya community.

Social organisation and customs
The Badimaya were reported to practise both circumcision and subincision.

Notable people
 Julie Dowling

Alternative names and spellings
Names according to Norman Tindale:
 Badimala
 Badimara
 Barimaia, Bardimaia, Badimaia
 Bidungu (Watjarri exonym, meaning "rockhole water drinkers," implying shiftlessness)
 Padimaia
 Parimaia
 Patimara
 Waadal
 Wardal

Conservation reserves
The allocated land includes portions of two former pastoral leases, Lakeside and Burnerbinmah, as well as Crown land at Kirkalocka and White Wells. There are many significant Aboriginal sites of significance as well as other historic sites.

Notes

Citations

Sources

Aboriginal peoples of Western Australia
Mid West (Western Australia)